In mathematics, the q-Konhauser polynomials are a q-analog of the Konhauser polynomials, introduced by .

References

Orthogonal polynomials